The Maijabi (Mayi-Yapi) were an indigenous Australian people of the state of Queensland.

Country
Their eastern boundary lay on the Flinders River and the lower Saxby, while their extension west ran to the upper Dismal Creek and the Leichhardt—Alexandra Divide.

Social organization and practices
The Maijabu were a non-circumcising tribe, and subincision likewise was not practiced.

History of contact
One early estimate of the number of Maijabi at the time of first contact was around 1,000. By 1868, they were down to 250 'souls', and by 1879 a remnant of about 80 survived. The reasons given for this were.
'the murderous onslaughts of the mounted Native Police and to venereal diseases and measles, which were introduced by ther Whites, also to prostitution and infanticide, which have enormously increased.'

Edward Palmer, who had taken over their hunting grounds on the Canobie Station in 1865, in talking of Maijabi food gathering, was the first white colonialist to discover what emerged to be the widespread practice of harvesting native purslane seeds, which the Maijabi called thukouro, by gathering the plants and threshing them in an improvised stone circle.
'The stems were eaten raw and also heated in ashes, the rest of the plant being placed on the heap to wilt. Maijabi women used freshwater mussel shells to scoop up the seed that accumulated. There it was ground between stones, pressed into cakes, and cooked in hot ashes.'

Alternative names
 Maippe, Myappe
 Majabi
 Miappi
 Miubbi
 Miulbi. (misprint)
 Myabi

Source:

Some words
 barrago. (whiteman)
 mecum caramra. (tame dog)
 moochoo. (father)
 yakoro. (mother)
 yamby. (wild dog)

Source:

Notes

Citations

Sources

Aboriginal peoples of Queensland